Dunluce Lower is a barony in County Antrim, Northern Ireland. To its north runs the north-Antrim coast, and it is bordered by three other baronies: Dunluce Upper to the south, Cary to the east, and the North East Liberties of Coleraine to the west. The River Bush flows through this barony. Dunluce Lower also formed the northern part of the medieval territory known as the Route.

History

List of main settlements
Below is a list of settlements in Dunluce Lower:

Towns
Portrush

Villages
Bushmills
Dervock
Portballintrae

Population centres
Priestland

List of civil parishes
Below is a list of civil parishes in Dunluce Lower:
Ballyrashane (also partly in barony of North-East Liberties of Coleraine)
Ballywillan (split with barony of North-East Liberties of Coleraine)
Billy (split with barony of Cary)
Derrykeighan
Dunluce

References